Coles is a patronymic surname of English origins deriving from either a pet form of the name Nicholas or from the Old English word meaning '"coal black".

Notable people with the surname include:

 Arthur William Coles (1892–1982), Australian businessman
 Vernell Eufaye "Bimbo" Coles (b. 1968), American basketball player
 Bryony Jean Coles (b. 1946), British prehistoric archaeologist
 Cameron Coles (b. 1974), Australian-born Scottish cricketer
 Cecil Frederick Coles (1888–1918), British composer
 Charles "Honi" Coles (1911–1992), American tap dancer
 Charlie Coles (1942–2013), American basketball player and coach
 Cowper Phipps Coles (1819–1870), British naval captain and designer
 Cyril Henry Coles (1899–1959), British writer, 50% of Manning Coles
 Daniel Richard Coles (b. 1981), English footballer
 Darnell Coles (b. 1962), American baseball player and coach
 Dennis Coles (b. 1970), Ghostface Killah of the Wu-Tang Clan
 Edward Coles (1786–1868), American politician
 Elisha Coles (1640–1680), English lexicographer
 Elizabeth Coles (1912–1975), British novelist Elizabeth Taylor
 Fenton George Coles (b. 1937), Welsh rugby player
 George Coles (cricketer, born 1798) (1798–1865), English amateur cricketer
 George Coles (politician) (1810–1875), Canadian politician; first Premier of Prince Edward Island
 George Edward Coles (1851–1903), English cricketer
 George Coles (architect) (1884–1963), English architect
 George James "G.J." Coles (1885–1977), founder of what was to become the Coles Group shopping empire, Australia
 H. Brent Coles (b. 1951), mayor of Boyse, Idaho
 Isaac Coles (1747–1813), American politician
 Kimberly Coles (b. 1962), American actress
 Joanne Coles (b. 1992), English motorcycle trials rider
 John Coles (1833–1919), English businessman
 John Coles (archaeologist) (1930-2020), archaeologist
 John David Coles, American TV and film director
 Leslie Stephen Coles (1941–2014), American biogerontologist and a key member of the Supercentenarian Research Foundation
 Laveranues Leon Coles (b. 1977), American football player
 Lisa Coles (b. 1964), American broadcaster Lisa Guerrero
 Manning Coles, pseudonymous of British spy writer's Adelaide Manning (1891-1955) and Cyril Coles (1899-1965)
 Mark Coles, New Zealand cricket coach
 Miriam Coles Harris (1834–1925), author whose anonymous first novel attracted several impostors
 Nathaniel Adams Coles (1919–1965), American jazz musician Nat King Cole
 Neil Chapman Coles (b. 1934), British golfer
 Peter Coles (b. 1963), Professor of Astrophysics at Cardiff University
 Ray Coles, mayor and committee member Lakewood, New Jersey
 Richard Coles (b. 1962), British musician and  clergyman
 Robert Coles (b. 1929), American psychiatrist, educator, author
 Robert Coles (–1655), early settler in New England
 Walter Coles (1790–1857), U.S. Representative from Virginia 
 William Coles Finch (1864–1944),English author and historian
 Wayne Coles-Janess, Australian writer, film director and producer

See also
Coles (disambiguation)
Sadie Coles HQ, gallery
Cole (surname)

References

English-language surnames